Robert Taylor Fisher (November 3, 1886 – August 4, 1963) was an American professional baseball shortstop, who played in Major League Baseball from 1912 to 1919.

In 503 games over seven seasons, Fisher posted a .276 batting average (480-for-1,742) with 189 runs, 11 home runs, and 170 RBIs. He recorded a .933 fielding percentage playing at shortstop and second base.

His older brother, Newt Fisher, played nine games for the Philadelphia Phillies in 1898.

References

External links

1886 births
1963 deaths
Major League Baseball shortstops
Brooklyn Dodgers players
Brooklyn Superbas players
Chicago Cubs players
Cincinnati Reds players
St. Louis Cardinals players
Baseball players from Tennessee
Minor league baseball managers
Charleston Sea Gulls players
Danville Red Sox players
Newark Indians players
Toronto Maple Leafs (International League) players
Los Angeles Angels (minor league) players
Rochester Hustlers players
Little Rock Travelers players
Vernon Tigers players
Minneapolis Millers (baseball) players
Nashville Vols players
Spartanburg Spartans players
Jacksonville Tars players
Florence Fiddlers players